The swing is a type of  hook, with the main difference being that in the swing the arm is usually more extended.

External links
 BoxRec.com

Boxing terminology
Punches (combat)